Orthanilic acid (2-aminobenzenesulfonic acid) is a biological acid with roles in benzoate degradation and microbial metabolism in diverse environments.

Orthanilic acid promotes reverse turn formation in peptides, inducing a folded conformation  when incorporated into peptide sequences (Xaa-SAnt-Yaa), showing robust 11-membered-ring hydrogen-bonding.

Orthanilic acid is a structural component of some azo dyes which consequently have poor bacterial degradation.

Orthanilic acids have also been found to affect cardiac tension.

References

Benzenesulfonic acids
Amino acid derivatives
Anilines